The 2005 Chinese Grand Prix (officially the 2005 Formula 1 Sinopec Chinese Grand Prix) was the nineteenth and final Formula One motor race of the 2005 Formula One season which took place on 16 October 2005 at the Shanghai International Circuit. This was the second Chinese Grand Prix to be held since the event's 2004 inception.

The race was won by the new World Champion, Renault's Fernando Alonso. McLaren driver Kimi Räikkönen was four seconds behind in second position, a reflection of their season long duel for the championship. Toyota driver Ralf Schumacher was third. Renault won the Constructors' Championship at this race.

This was the final race for Antônio Pizzonia and the BAR, Minardi  and Jordan teams, although all three teams continued into 2006 under different names (Honda, Toro Rosso and Midland respectively). This was also the last win for a car equipped with a 6-speed gearbox and with a V10 engine.

Friday drivers 
The bottom 6 teams in the 2004 Constructors' Championship were entitled to run a third car in free practice on Friday. These drivers drove on Friday but did not compete in qualifying or the race.

Report

Background 
After the Japanese Grand Prix, Fernando Alonso led the drivers' standings with 19 points ahead of Kimi Räikkönen and 61 points ahead of Michael Schumacher. Renault led the constructors' championship by 2 points ahead of McLaren and 76 points ahead of Ferrari.

Qualifying 
Alonso took pole ahead of his teammate Giancarlo Fisichella. Raikkonen finished third ahead of Jenson Button and Juan Pablo Montoya.

Race
During warmup, as the cars ran from the pits to line up on the grid, a slow-moving Michael Schumacher pulled left into the path of Christijan Albers who was at speed. The cars collided causing considerable damage to each, earning Schumacher a reprimand from the stewards after the race. Both drivers changed to their teams' spare cars and started the race from the pitlane, along with Narain Karthikeyan. Alonso dominated the race, taking a lights-to-flag victory, capping a best-ever season for Renault which included victories in both titles. McLaren's bid for the constructors' championship effectively ended on lap 5, when Montoya's engine failed, ending his race, having also sustained damage from running over a loose drain cover.

Renault's number two driver Giancarlo Fisichella's chances of making the podium ended when he received a drive-through penalty for obstructive driving in the pits during the second safety car period. He ended the race less than a second behind Ralf Schumacher. Red Bull's Christian Klien had a career-best drive to take fifth position with Felipe Massa, Mark Webber and Jenson Button completing the point-scoring finishers. Räikkönen recorded the race's fastest lap, a record-equalling tenth for the season.

Classification

Qualifying
Qualifying took place on October 15.

Race

Notes
  – Michael Schumacher, Narain Karthikeyan and Christijan Albers started from the pit lane.

Championship standings after the race 
Bold text indicates the World Champions.

Drivers' Championship standings

Constructors' Championship standings

Note: Only the top five positions are included for both sets of standings.

References

Chinese Grand Prix
Grand Prix
Chinese Grand Prix
Chinese Grand Prix